James Wuye is a Pastor of the General Council of the Assemblies of God Nigeria and co-director with Imam Muhammad Ashafa of the Interfaith Mediation Center of the Muslim-Christian Dialogue in Kaduna, Kaduna State, Northern Nigeria.

Biography 

He is the son a soldier who fought the Biafra War.During the 1980s and 1990s, he participated in riots and interfaith violence. For eight years he served as Secretary General of the Kaduna State chapter for the Youth Christian Association of Nigeria (YCAN), an organization representing all Christian groups in the country. In 1987, he became an interpreter in a church of General Council of the Assemblies of God Nigeria in Kaduna. He obtained a degree in theology from the AG’s Northern Theological Seminary in Kaduna. Then he went on to graduate with an undergraduate degree from Vision University, Kaduna campus and a master's degree in theology from West Africa Christian University.

During a confrontation between Christians and Muslims in Zongon Kataf, James Wuye lost his right arm, while Muslim Youth Councils Secretary General Muhammad Ashafa lost two cousins and his spiritual mentor. In 1995, the two former opponents decided to work together and build bridges between their respective communities and founded Interfaith Mediation Center of the Muslim-Christian Dialogue in Kaduna. The organization provide interfaith training to young people in schools and universities, to women, religious leaders and politicians. The center has thus contributed to defusing tensions in the 2002 and 2004 clashes in Kaduna and Yelwa.

Documentary Films
Imam Ashafa and Pastor Wuye have been the subject of two documentary films:
 The Imam and the Pastor (2006)
 An African Answer (2010)

Honors
Pastor James Wuye and Imam Muhammad Ashafa have received the Breme Peace Award in 2005, the Prize for Conflict Prevention awarded by the Fondation Chirac in 2009 and the Deutsche Afrika-Preis awarded by the German Africa Foundation in 2013.

They were among five recipients of this year’s prestigious 2017 ‘Intercultural Innovation Award’, conferred by the United Nations Alliance of Civilizations and BMW, for their successful mediations in conflicts in Nigeria. The award ceremony took place at UN Headquarters in New York on 29 November.

References

External links
 A Discussion with Pastor James Wuye and Imam Muhammad Ashafa, Berkley Center at Georgetown University, Oct. 2011.
 An African Answer: Pastor James Wuye and Imam Muhammad Ashafa, BBC, Nov. 2010.

Year of birth missing (living people)
Living people
Nigerian Pentecostal pastors
Assemblies of God pastors
Christian and Islamic interfaith dialogue